Eburia bahamicae is a species of beetle in the family Cerambycidae, that can be found on the Bahamas.

References

bahamicae
Beetles described in 1932